This is a list of Damash Gilans results in the  2010–11 season. The club was competing in the Azadegan League and Hazfi Cup.

Players

Appearances and goals
Appearance and goalscoring records for all the players who are in the Damash Gilan first team squad during the 2010–11 season.Last update May 12, 2011.

|}

Match results

Regular reason

Hazfi Cup

Goal scorers

Squad changes during 2010/11 season

In

Out

References

External links
 Official website
 Damash Gilan fan site
Azadegan League statistics
Persian League

Damash Gilan seasons
Dam